José Pedro Cruz Sousa Neto (born 10 February 1993), commonly known as Zé Pedro, is a Portuguese professional footballer who plays for Belenenses as a left back.

Club career
On 18 July 2021, he signed with Belenenses.

Honours

Club
Real Massamá
Campeonato de Portugal: 2016–17

References

External links

1993 births
Living people
Sportspeople from Cascais
Portuguese sportspeople of Angolan descent
Portuguese footballers
Portuguese expatriate footballers
Association football defenders
S.U. Sintrense players
Casa Pia A.C. players
Real S.C. players
FC Eindhoven players
C.F. Os Belenenses players
Liga Portugal 2 players
Segunda Divisão players
Eerste Divisie players
Portuguese expatriate sportspeople in the Netherlands
Expatriate footballers in the Netherlands